Before achieving statehood in 1959, the Territory of Hawaii was represented by a non-voting territorial delegate. From statehood until 1963, Hawaii had one Representative. From 1963 to the creation of the two districts in 1971, Hawaii was represented in the United States House of Representatives with two Representatives. The district was eliminated in the 1970 redistricting cycle after the 1970 United States census.

List of members representing the district 

A second seat was added in 1963.

References

 Congressional Biographical Directory of the United States 1774–present

At-large
Former congressional districts of the United States
At-large United States congressional districts